Gloucester City Hockey Club is a field hockey club that is based at Gloucester. It has two home ground venues; the Oxstalls Tennis Centre, Plock Court, Longford and at St Peter's High School, Gloucester.

The club runs five women's teams  with the first XI playing in the Women's England Hockey League Division One North. The men's section has four men's teams  with the first XI playing in the Men's Verde Recreo League.

References

English field hockey clubs
1901 establishments in England
Sport in Gloucester
Sport in Gloucestershire